Seema Mahesh Hiray is an Indian politician and member of the Bharatiya Janata Party. She won the Nashik west constituency in the Maharashtra Assembly Election 2014 & 2019.

References 

Bharatiya Janata Party politicians from Maharashtra
Maharashtra MLAs 2014–2019
Living people
Year of birth missing (living people)
Marathi politicians